Vrpolje is a village and a municipality in Brod-Posavina County, Croatia. It is located 10 km south of Đakovo; elevation 90 m. The population of the municipality is 3,521.

See also
Strizivojna–Vrpolje railway station

References

Populated places in Brod-Posavina County
Slavonia
Municipalities of Croatia